

Insects

Vertebrates

Conodonts

Archosauromorphs

Newly named phytosaurs

Newly named pseudosuchians

Newly named dinosaurs

References 

1850s in paleontology
Paleontology, 1856 In